Paulette F. C. Steeves is the Canada Research Chair in Healing and Reconciliation at Algoma University.

Education and career 
Steeves is Cree-Métis and was born in Whitehorse, Yukon. She spent her formative years in Lillooet, British Columbia, Canada. Steeves holds an BA in Anthropology degree from the University of Arkansas at Fayetteville. She holds a Master in Anthropology from the State University of New York at Binghamton (SUNY), Her masters thesis was titled "Archaeology, CRM, Academia, and Ethics, and, Akimel O'odham, Type 2 Diabetes: Links to Traditional Food Loss."

In 2008 she was awarded the Clifford D. Clark fellowship to attend graduate studies and earned her PhD in 2015 from Binghamton. Steeves dissertation "Decolonising Indigenous Histories: Pleistocene Archeology Sites of the Western hemisphere" was the first thesis using Indigenous method and theory in Anthropology within the United States. Throughout her graduate studies Steeves taught at Fort Peck Community College and Selkirk College.

Following completion of her PhD, Steeves was hired as the interim director of the University of Massachusetts Amherst's Native American Studies Program.  She then taught at Mount Allison University as an Assistant Professor in the Anthropology and Indigenous Studies program.

In 2019 Steeves was hired by Algoma University and appointed as a Tier II Canada Research Chair in Healing and Reconciliation.

She is a member of the Editorial Board for American Antiquity.

Research 
Steeves' research focuses on the Pleistocene history of the Americas.  Her research argues that artifacts and sacred sites show that Indigenous people were in North America more than 130,000 years ago. Her research decolonizes historical narratives about Indigenous people and settlement of the Americas. Steeves' first book, The Indigenous Paleolithic of the Western Hemisphere was published by the University of Nebraska Press in July 2021.

Awards 

 Tier II Canada Research Chair, 2019.
 UMASS Amherst SBS Research Grant, 2016.
 SUNY Binghamton GSEU Professional Development Award, 2013.
 American Archaeology Association, Archaeology Division, Student Travel Grant, 2012.
 Society for American Archaeology, Arthur C. Parker Scholarship, 2010
 Clifford D. Clark Fellowship, 2015.

Publications 

 Steeves, P. (2021). The Indigenous Paleolithic of the Western Hemisphere. University of Nebraska Press.
 Steeves, P. (2020). Mesa Verde Geography and Culture. ''Encyclopedia of Global Archaeology' 2nd edition. (Ed.), Claire Smith.  Springer New York.
Steeves, P. (2020). Clovis and Folsom, Indigenous occupation prior to. ''Encyclopedia of Global Archaeology' 2nd edition. (Ed.), Claire Smith. Springer New York.
Steeves, P. F. (2019). Our Earliest Ancestors. Interrogating Human Origins: Decolonisation and the Deep Human Past.
Steeves, P. F. (2018). La Sena. Journal: Encyclopedia of Global Archaeology, 1-10.
 Steeves, P. (2017). Unpacking Neoliberal Archaeological Control of Ancient Indigenous Heritage. Archaeologies, 13(1), 48–65.
 Steeves, Paulette. F (2016). Unpacking Neo-liberal Archaeological control of Ancient Indigenous Heritage. Critical Heritage Conference, Session Heritage and the Late Modern State. Archaeologies, Journal of the World Archaeological Congress. Special Edition.
 Steeves, P. F. (2015). Decolonizing Indigenous histories, Pleistocene archaeology sites of the Western Hemisphere. State University of New York at Binghamton.
 Steeves, P. (2015). Academia, Archaeology, CRM, and Tribal Historic Preservation. Archaeologies, 11(1), 121–141.
Steeves, P. F. (2014). We are the Face of Oaxaca: Testimony and Social Movements. By Lynn Stephen. Durham and London: Duke University Press, 2013.

References

External links

 Traditional Knowledge & Reconciliation - Dr. Paulette Steeves presents at the Universities Canada 5th Annual Building Reconciliation Forum, December 12, 2019 
 New fossil discoveries and Indigenous origins Dr. Steeves on Native America Calling, October 4, 2021 

Living people
Academic staff of Algoma University
Binghamton University alumni
Canada Research Chairs
Canadian anthropologists
Canadian archaeologists
Canadian indigenous women academics
Cree people
First Nations academics
First Nations activists
First Nations women
People from Whitehorse
Year of birth missing (living people)